The first edition of Liège–Bastogne–Liège for Women, a road cycling one-day race in Belgium, was held on 23 April 2017. It was the eighth event of the 2017 UCI Women's World Tour. The race started in Bastogne and finished in Ans, containing four categorized climbs and covering a total distance of 135.5 km. 139 riders started the race, 98 finished.

Dutch rider and reigning Olympic road race champion Anna van der Breggen won the event, thus completing a set of wins in all three races of the Ardennes classics. Van der Breggen had already won Amstel Gold Race and La Flèche Wallonne in the week leading up to Liège–Bastogne–Liège. All three races had the same runner-up and third-place finisher on the podium.

Race summary
The first climb of the day, the Côte de la Vecquée, caused a first selection in the peloton. By the top of La Redoute, 40 riders remained in the lead group.

At 20 km from the finish, Polish rider Katarzyna Niewiadoma attacked on the upper slopes of the Roche aux Faucons and was rejoined by Lizzie Deignan, Anna van der Breggen, Ashleigh Moolman and Elisa Longo Borghini. On the last climb, the Côte de Saint-Nicolas, Niewiadoma accelerated from the quintet, but her move was marked by van der Breggen who broke clear just after the top of Saint-Nicolas and powered on solo to the finish. Lizzie Deignan took second place before Niewiadoma.

Result

References

External links
 Official website
 
 Highlights of the race on YouTube

2017 UCI Women's World Tour
2017 in Belgian sport
2017
April 2017 sports events in Europe